The 2023 IBU Open European Championships were held from 25 to 29 January 2023 at the Roland Arena in Lenzerheide, Switzerland.

Schedule
All times are local (UTC+1).

Results

Men's

Women's

Mixed

Medal table

References

External links
Official website

2023
IBU Open European
IBU Open European
International sports competitions hosted by Switzerland
Biathlon competitions in Switzerland
IBU